Stylissa carteri, commonly known as elephant ear sponge, is a species of sponge found from the Red Sea to Australia.

References

Halichondrida
Sponges described in 1889
Taxa named by Arthur Dendy